Stalpersia is a genus of mushrooms in the family Auriscalpiaceae. The genus is monotypic, containing the single species Stalpersia orientalis.

References

External links
 Stalpersia at Index Fungorum

Russulales
Monotypic Russulales genera